Melbourne City Women's Football Club, also known as the Melbourne City Women or simply as City, represents Melbourne City in the A-League Women, the top division soccer league in Australia.  Founded in 2015, the club has its training and administration based at the City Football Academy in Melbourne and plays matches at Casey Fields in Casey and at AAMI Park in Melbourne. The current manager of the team is Dario Vidošić.

History
Following on from their purchase of and investment into Manchester City in England, City Football Group turned their eyes to investment into the women's game as well, funding a serious overhaul of the Manchester club's female affiliate. Only months after their takeover of the men's team Melbourne City FC, they followed likewise on the women's side, contacting the FFA regarding entering a team into the W-League to be affiliated to the men's Melbourne side.

After a year of negotiations, their involvement was sealed with an announcement that a women's team competing under the name Melbourne City FC would compete in the W-League as of the beginning of the 2015–16 season.

Four championships and two premierships (2015–20)
Melbourne City CEO Scott Munn revealed that his club had been in consultation with Football Federation Australia (FFA) for over 12 months regarding the introduction of a new W-League side. In July 2015, Melbourne City Women's FC made Matildas co-captain Lisa De Vanna their first-ever signing. She is widely regarded as one of the world's best women's strikers. After De Vanna, the club's next foundation signings were Laura Alleway and Brianna Davey. In September 2015, Young Matildas Larissa Crummer, Alex Chidiac, Beattie Goad and former Adelaide United defender Monique Iannella joined the club. Matilda Steph Catley also signed up in September. Regarded as a Matlidas' fan favourite, Catley created history when she was voted as the first female to appear on the cover of the video game FIFA 16.

The club created history in its inaugural 2015–16 season, winning all 12 of its regular season games to become Premiers (regular-season winners) and becoming Champions by winning the 2016 W-League grand final, completing a perfect season. In the following season, City suffered a six-match winless run during the middle part of the season before storming back into the finals series and claiming a second successive championship in the 2017 grand final. This achievement meant the club was equal with several other clubs for the greatest number of championships won in the league. The club then eclipsed this record the following season when it defeated Sydney FC in the 2018 W-League grand final making it 3 championships in a row.

City had an undefeated 2019/20 season, with 11 wins and one draw, and secured their second premiership. Under Head Coach Rado Vidošić, and with elite talent on the pitch such as the returning Steph Catley and new players Kyah Simon and Claire Emslie, the team went on to win the double following wins over Western Sydney Wanderers and Sydney FC in the 2020 Finals Series. Consequently, City became the first team in W-League history to secure four championships.

Stadium
Melbourne City Women play most of their home matches at the Casey Fields VFL Oval, home ground of the Casey Demons. The club also typically plays home matches and finals at AAMI Park in the city centre, home stadium of the men's team.

The club has previously split home games between CB Smith Reserve in Fawkner, John Ilhan Memorial Reserve in Broadmeadows and Frank Holohan Reserve in Dandenong.

Players

First-team squad

Notable former players
Below is a list of notable players for Melbourne City. Generally, this list includes former players that have played 50 or more first-class matches for the club, have at least one senior international cap, and/or have made significant contributions to the club's history. For a full list of current and former players see Melbourne City FC (A-League Women) players.

 Australia
 Teigen Allen
 Laura Alleway
 Hannah Brewer
 Larissa Crummer
 Brianna Davey
 Lisa De Vanna
 Elise Kellond-Knight
 Alanna Kennedy

 Mexico
 Anisa Guajardo

 Scotland
 Jen Beattie
 Claire Emslie
 Kim Little

 United States
 Ashley Hatch
 Erika Tymrak

 Wales
 Jess Fishlock

Managers

Current technical staff

Managerial history

Honours

Domestic
W-League/A-League Women Premiership:
Winners (2): 2015–16, 2019–20

W-League/A-League Women Championship
Winners (4): 2016, 2017, 2018, 2020

See also
 List of top-division football clubs in AFC countries
 Women's football in Australia
 A-League Women records and statistics
 Australia women's national football team

References

External links
 
W-League official website
Football Federation Australia official website

 
Melbourne City FC
Association football clubs established in 2015
2015 establishments in Australia
Women's soccer clubs in Australia
A-League Women teams